Athletics at the 2018 Asian Games was held at Gelora Bung Karno Stadium, Jakarta, Indonesia from 25 to 30 August 2018.

Schedule

Medalists

Men

Women

Mixed

Medal table

Participating nations
A total of 688 athletes from 43 nations competed in athletics at the 2018 Asian Games:

References

External links
Athletics at the 2018 Asian Games
Official Result Book – Athletics

 
Athletics
2018
Asian Games
2018 Asian Games